Francisco Delgado López may refer to:
Francisco Delgado López (bishop) (1514–1576), Spanish Roman Catholic bishop
Francisco "Paco" Delgado López or Paco Delgado, Canarian costume designer